Edison laboratory or laboratories refers to one of American inventor and businessman Thomas Edison's labs:

 the original Menlo Park, New Jersey laboratory, now:
 memorialized as Thomas Alva Edison Memorial Tower and Museum
 at Edison State Park, located in the Menlo Park section of Edison, New Jersey
 relocated and preserved at Greenfield Village in Michigan
 the West Orange, New Jersey laboratories, now preserved as Thomas Edison National Historical Park

See also 
 General Electric Research Laboratory, the first industrial research facility in the United States